Castellciutat is a village in the municipality of la Seu d'Urgell (Alt Urgell, Catalonia). In the past it was called Ciutat (City in English) but is now called either Ciutat or Castellciutat. It has a population of 451 inhabitants.

There is an old castle, Castell de Ciutat (Castle of the City), which gives its name to the village.

See also
El Balcó del Pirineu

References 

La Seu d'Urgell
Populated places in Alt Urgell